Avala Antharanga  is a 1984 Indian Kannada-language film directed by R. N. Jayagopal. It stars Kalyan Kumar, Aarathi and Roopa Devi in lead roles. The music of the film was composed by M. Ranga Rao. Roopa Devi ( as Lead Actress ) and Shyam Sunder ( as Male Supporting Actor ) won the Karnataka State Film awards  for this movie.

Cast
 Kalyan Kumar
 Aarathi
 Roopa Devi
Ashok
 Shyam Sunder

Soundtrack

References

External links 
 

1984 films
1980s Kannada-language films
Films directed by R. N. Jayagopal